Albert Piaget (born 13 April 1928) is a Swiss former field hockey player. He competed in the men's tournament at the 1960 Summer Olympics.

References

External links
 

1928 births
Possibly living people
Swiss male field hockey players
Olympic field hockey players of Switzerland
Field hockey players at the 1960 Summer Olympics
People from Neuchâtel
Sportspeople from the canton of Neuchâtel